This is a list of notable people from Multan city and Multan District.

Scholars
 Syed Ata Ullah Shah Bukhari, Muslim scholar
 Anwaar Ahmad, writer and academician

Sports
 Aamer Bashir, cricketer
 Ali Sawal, cricketer and sports commentator
 Arif Mehmood, football player
 Asmavia Iqbal, cricketer
 Aamer Yamin, cricketer
 Farhan Khan, Omani cricketer
 Inzamam-ul-Haq, cricketer
 Naveed Akram, football player
 Rahat Ali, cricketer
 Sania Khan, cricketer
 Saqib Ali, cricketer
 Sohaib Maqsood, cricketer
 Sukhan Faiz, cricketer
 Khurram Khan, UAE cricketer
 Robin Kreyer (1910-1987), cricketer and British Army/British Indian Army officer
 Imam-ul-Haq, cricketer

Rulers
 Ahmad Shah Durrani, founder of  Durrani Empire
 Bahlul Lodi, founder of  Lodhi dynasty
 Fateh Daud, ruler of Multan
 Khizr Khan, founder of Sayyid dynasty of Delhi sultanate
 Nawab Ali Mohammad Khan Khakwani, Governor of Multan, Durrani Empire
 Nawab Zahid Khan (From 1738 to 1748)
 Nawab Shuja Khan - Governor of Multan and founder of Shujabad
 Nawab Muzaffar Khan Governor of Multan and founder of Muzaffargarh

Politicians
 Buland Akhtar Rana, politician and civil servant.
 Sahibzada Farooq Ali, former Speaker of the National Assembly
 Fakhar Imam, former Speaker of the National Assembly
 Hamid Raza Gillani, politician
 Zain ul Abadeen Gillani, politician
 Hamid Saeed Kazmi, politician
 Hina Rabbani Khar, politician
 Javed Hashmi, politician
 Najaf Abbasi (politician)
 Rafique Rajwana, Senator & Governor Punjab
 Shaukat Tarin, banker, politician
 Sikandar Hayat Khan, Punjabi politician
 Sheikh Muhammad Tahir Rasheed, politician
 Yousaf Raza Gillani, former Prime Minister of Pakistan
 Shah Mehmood Qureshi, former Foreign Minister of Pakistan

Holy figures
 Dewan Mulraj, Sikh saint
 Fariduddin Ganjshakar, Saint
 Mai Maharban, female saint
 Syed Musa Pak, Muslim Sufi
 Rukn-e-Alam, Muslim Sufi

Scientists
 H. Gobind Khorana, Nobel prize winner scientist

Others
 Mirza Aziz Akbar Baig, advocate and former Vice Chairman of Pakistan Bar Council
 Mazhar Kaleem, writer and novelist
 Muhammad Sharif, cosmologist
 Mahindar Pall Singh, Sikh MPA, politician and Business man
 Ravi Batra, Indian-American economist and professor
 Syed Noor Ul Hassan Bukhari (Scholar writer )
 Sadiq Ali Shahzad, sculptor
 Saima Noor, film actress
 Najam Sheraz, singer
 Hamza Ali Abbasi, film actor
 Hajra Yamin, actress

 01
Multan-related lists
Multan
Multan